"Frederick and Catherine" (also called "Freddy and Katy Lizzy") is a German fairy tale collected by the Brothers Grimm in Grimm's Fairy Tales, number 59.

It combines several Aarne-Thompson types: 1387, A Woman Draws Beer in the Cellar; 1385*, A Woman Loses Her Husband's Money; 1291B, A Fool Greeses the Cracked Earth with Butter; 1291, Sending One Cheese After Another; 1653A, Securing the Door; 1653, The Robbers under the Tree; 1383, A Woman Does Not Know Herself; and 1791, Dividing Up the Dead.

Synopsis
Frederick and Catherine were husband and wife.  He left to do his work.  She started to fry a sausage and thought she could get a beer while it cooked.  In the cellar, drawing it, she realized the dog was loose and might eat the sausage, but the dog had already done so, and she chased it but could not catch it.  Meanwhile, the keg of beer emptied itself into the cellar.  To hide this, she used flour she bought at a fair to dry it. Frederick was furious hearing this.

Frederick had some gold, told his wife it was counters for games, and hid it in the house.  Peddlars came by and Catherine offered them the counters.  When Frederick found out, they set out in chase, and Catherine, falling behind, felt pity for the ruts in the road and smeared butter for their hurts.  When a cheese rolled out of her pocket, she sent another to fetch it back, and then all the rest!  Frederick sent her back to get food.  She brought back dried pears, vinegar, and the door (to keep it secure).  They were caught in a tree with robbers underneath.  She had to let go of these things one by one:  the thieves thought the pears were leaves, the vinegar dew, and the door the devil itself, which made them flee.  They get their gold back in the morning and went home.

Catherine went out to cut the grain and cut all her clothing to pieces until she did not know herself.

Catherine saw some thieves and offered to help them.  When they agreed, she went about calling for people who wanted to be robbed.

Catherine went to pull up beets in the pastor's garden, but looked so strange than someone told the pastor that the devil was in his garden.  This person helped the lame pastor there, but at the sight of her, they ran off, and the lame pastor could run faster than the man who helped him.

References

Grimms' Fairy Tales
Literary duos
ATU 1200-1349
ATU 1350-1439
ATU 1640-1674
ATU 1725-1849